Getingarna was a motorcycle speedway club from Stockholm in Sweden. They hold the record for  Swedish Championships with 14 league titles to their name.

History
The club's first name was Motorsällskapet and they competed in the very first Swedish speedway season in 1948. They adopted the name Getingarna the following season and rode at the Stockholm Olympic Stadium from 1949 to 1953.

They later rode at the Gubbängens Idrottsplats and would go on to become the most successful speedway club in Sweden by winning 14 championships in 1952, 1963, 1964, 1965, 1966, 1967, 1969, 1974, 1978, 1979, 1981, 1982, 1985 and (1989 as Stockholm United).

The club nickname was the Wasps named after a rider called Bertil Andersson. In 1988, the team merged with the club called Gamarna and became Stockholm United. They were called Stockholm United from 1988 to 1990 and won the Championship in 1989.

In 2002, the club ran into financial difficulties and finally closed in 2010. The shale speedway track was demolished with a running track being built in its place.

Season summary

References 

Swedish speedway teams
Sport in Stockholm